Apayao, officially the Province of Apayao, is a landlocked province in the Philippines in the Cordillera Administrative Region in Luzon.  Kabugao serves as its capital. The provincial capitol and its associated offices are located at the New Government Center in Luna.

The province borders Cagayan to the north and east, Abra and Ilocos Norte to the west, and Kalinga to the south. Prior to 1995, Kalinga and Apayao comprised a single province named Kalinga-Apayao, which was partitioned to better service the needs of individual ethnic groups.

History
By 20th century, Apayao is predominated by the Isneg people. They are located primarily in the highland municipalities of Kabugao and Calanasan. Majority of them live in scattered settlements along the upper reaches of the Apayao-Abulug River; while some along a major tributary of the Matalag River in Conner.

Spanish period
Although Apayao which was then part of Cagayan, was among the earliest areas penetrated by the Spaniards in the Cordilleras, the region, inhabited by the Isneg tribe, remained largely outside Spanish control until late in the 19th century. As early as 1610, the Dominican friars established a mission in what is now the town of Pudtol. In 1684, the friars again made attempts to convert the people and established a church in what is now Kabugao.

The Spanish authorities were then able to establish in Cagayan the comandancias of Apayao and Cabugaoan in 1891, which covered the western and eastern portions of what is now Apayao. The comandancias, however, failed to bring total control and the Spanish government only maintained a loose hold over the area.

American period
Apayao was established through Act No. 1642 on May 9, 1907 as a sub-province of Cagayan province.

The Americans established the Mountain Province on August 13, 1908, with the enactment of Act No. 1876. Apayao was incorporated; and along with Amburayan, Benguet, Bontoc, Ifugao, Kalinga, and Lepanto, became sub-provinces of this new province.

In the early years, the sub-province underwent series of territorial changes:
  Part of Apayao was transferred to the Province of Ilocos Norte (Executive Order 21, 1920).
 1922: A barrio of municipal district of Bayag (now Calanasan) was transferred to Namaltugan.
 1927: Parts of the municipal district of Pinukpuk in Kalinga were annexed to Conner.
 Through EO 200, approved on September 6, 1929, barrios in Tauit were organized into a separate municipal district, Luna, effective October 1.
 Through EO 13, approved on January 21, 1936, Tauit was abolished and was annexed as a single barrio to Luna, effective February 1.
 Through EO 78, approved on December 23, 1936, Namaltugan was abolished and was annexed to Bayag and Kabugao, effective January 1, 1937.

In the early years, Apayao as a sub-province was divided into seven municipal districts, all Isneg predominated.

While the Isneg clashed with the Philippine Constabulary in the early years, the families attempted to escape the area and go into the mountains of Ilocos Norte and Abra. They were involved in an attack in Tauit in 1913.

World War II

In 1942, Japanese Imperial forces entered Apayao, starting a three-year occupation of the province during the Second World War. Local Filipino troops of the 1st, 2nd, 12th, 15th, and 16th Infantry Division of the Philippine Commonwealth Army and the military forces of the USAFIP-NL 11th and 66th Infantry Regiment, supported by the Cordilleran guerrillas, drove out the Japanese in 1945.

During the Second World War, Kabugao was occupied for a year by the Japanese; an Isneg guerilla force was organized under a United States Army captain who had escaped the Fall of Bataan. Little fighting occurred in the sub-province, but a number of Isneg fought with the American and Filipino forces in the Cagayan Valley and in the neighboring areas. The war and the post-war era seen development among the Isnegs, although slowly.

Kalinga-Apayao creation and splitting

On June 18, 1966, the huge Mountain Province was split into four provinces with the enactment of Republic Act No. 4695. The four provinces were Benguet, Bontoc (renamed "Mountain Province"), Kalinga-Apayao and Ifugao. Kalinga-Apayao, along with Ifugao, became one of the provinces of the Cagayan Valley region in 1972.

On July 15, 1987, the Cordillera Administrative Region was established and Kalinga-Apayao was made one of its provinces.

Finally, on February 14, 1995, Kalinga-Apayao was split into two independent provinces with the passage of Republic Act No. 7878.

Biodiversity and biosphere reserve

Apayao is biologically diverse. The province is sanctuary to 139 bird species, 61 of which are endemic and 4 threatened. It also has 43 species of wild food plants eaten by the indigenous people and 50 species of medicinal plants. The province is home to critically endangered rufous hornbills, lawaan or dipterocarp trees, Raflesia flowers, and the white-winged flying fox.

The Philippine Eagle Foundation began its search of eagles in Apayao in 2011 after reports of huge eagles were roaming the area for centuries. On March 22, 2013, scientists discovered the stronghold of critically endangered Philippine eagles, the country's national bird, in Luzon island within the vicinity of the Calanasan Lowland Forest. In January 2015, the town of Calanasan initiated a program which protected 3,000 hectares of forests under its jurisdiction. Additionally, the province of Apayao is one of the very few in the country that has an approved forest land use plan (FLUP). The first active Philippine eagle nest in Apayao was discovered in July 2015.

On 9 July 2018, the provincial government of Apayao announced their intent for the province to be a UNESCO Biosphere Reserve. The province, which possesses more than 286,000 hectares of virgin forests, also noted that they have sent four of their personnel to train in the United States under the US Foreign Service to hasten the declaration of the site. On January 16, 2019, the provincial government announced that they were doing "legwork for the inscription."

Tauit
Tauit (or Tawit), an Isneg settlement along the lower Apayao-Abulug River, was a former municipal district and Apayao's first sub-provincial capital (1907–1915) until the capital was moved to Kabugao in August 1915 by virtue of Executive Order No. 45. It had been existed by the time of creation of the sub-province of Apayao.

Tauit is said to be the forerunner of the present-day Pudtol. Its seat of government at Barrio Tawit was later divided into four barangays in the municipality.

In 1913, a band of Isneg attacked Tauit, as they were infuriated by the large number of Ilocano settling in the territory under the protection of the local government.

In 1926, Allacapan was founded as its municipal district. In July 1927, the area was separated from Tauit and was organized into an independent one with the same name by virtue of EO No. 68. It was ceded to the province of Cagayan in 1928.

In 1929, a separate municipal district taken from Tauit, Macatel (later renamed Luna through a resolution), was organized through EO No. 200.

Difficulties in transportation led to the decision to abandon Tauit as a municipal district and to be represented by Luna.

Tauit was abolished through EO No. 13, issued on January 21, 1936 and effective February 1, with remaining territories annexed as a single barrio to Luna. These territories were established as the municipal district of Pudtol upon its creation on December 3, 1956 through EO No. 217.

Parts of the territories of Pudtol and Luna were later established as the municipalities of Flora and Santa Marcela; meanwhile, Tauit also comprised some parts of Lasam in Cagayan. At present, remnants of Tauit are located in northeastern Apayao and in few parts of Cagayan.

Geography

Apayao is basically situated within the Cordillera Central mountains, traversed by many rivers. The province covers an area of  forming the northern tip of the Cordillera Administrative Region, and is bounded on the north and east by Cagayan, west by Ilocos Norte, southwest by Abra and south by Kalinga.

The province is geographically subdivided into Upper Apayao (composed of the upland municipalities: Calanasan, Conner and Kabugao) and Lower Apayao (the lowland municipalities: Luna, Pudtol, Flora and Sta. Marcela).

Plains and valleys are used for farming. Apayao is basically composed of farmlands.

Climate
The prevailing climate in the province falls under Corona's Type III Classification. It is characterized by relatively dry and wet seasons, from November to April, and wet during the rest of the year. Heaviest rain during December to February while the month of May is the warmest.

Administrative divisions
Apayao comprises 7 municipalities, all encompassed by a lone legislative district.

Barangays
The 7 municipalities of the province comprise a total of 133 barangays, with Barangay Malama in Conner as the most populous in 2015, and Eleazar in Calanasan as the least.

Demographics

Economy

Apayao is devoted to agricultural production, particularly food and industrial crops such as palay, corn, coffee, root crops and vegetables. Fruits produced include lanzones, citrus, bananas and pineapples, durian, santol, rambutan, coconut and mangosteen. Rice production totaled 98,489 metric tons in 2011. Parts of Apayao are home to rice terraces.

Economic activity is also based on livestock and poultry breeding such as swine, carabao, cattle, goat and sheep. Other additional investment includes manufacturing, food processing, furniture, crafts and house wares making.

Updated records of the Department of Trade and Industry Provincial Office reveal that existing industries in the province are furniture, garment craft, food processing, gifts and house wares, and agricultural support.

The people of Apayao also have a rich tradition of basket, handicraft, and textile weaving.

References

External links

 
 

 
Provinces of the Philippines
Provinces of the Cordillera Administrative Region
Former sub-provinces of the Philippines
States and territories established in 1995
1995 establishments in the Philippines